Eucalyptus brockwayi, commonly known as Dundas mahogany, is a tree that is endemic to Western Australia. It has smooth, shiny bark on the trunk and branches, glossy green, linear to narrow lance-shaped adult leaves, flower buds arranged in groups of between eleven and fifteen, white flowers and spherical fruit with a narrow neck.

Description
Eucalyptus brockwayi is a tree that typically grows to a height of  but does not form a lignotuber. It has smooth, shiny light grey, pinkish and creamy white bark on its trunk and branches. Flowering occurs from March to June and the flowers are white.

Taxonomy and naming
Eucalyptus brockwayi was first formally described in 1943 by Charles Gardner and the description was published in Journal of the Royal Society of Western Australia. The specific epithet (brockwayi) honours George Ernest Emerson Brockway, for his contribution to "knowledge of the genus Eucalyptus" in eastern parts of Western Australia.

Distribution and habitat
Dundas mahogany is found in small stands on low, rocky hills and slopes in woodland and forest in the Norseman and Dundas areas.

Conservation
Eucalyptus brockwayi is classified as "Priority Three" by the Government of Western Australia Department of Parks and Wildlife meaning that it is poorly known and known from only a few locations but is not under imminent threat.

See also
List of Eucalyptus species

References

brockwayi
Endemic flora of Western Australia
Myrtales of Australia
Eucalypts of Western Australia
Trees of Australia
Goldfields-Esperance
Plants described in 1943
Taxa named by Charles Gardner